A mixed drink is a beverage in which two or more ingredients are mixed.

Types
 List of non-alcoholic mixed drinks -- A non-alcoholic mixed drink (also known as virgin cocktail, temperance drink, or mocktail) is a cocktail-style beverage made without alcoholic ingredients.
 Soft drink

Caffeinated
 Coffee drinks: Iced coffee
 List of chocolate drinks — chocolate contains a small amount of caffeine
 Energy drink
 Teas

Herbal

 Kava — not traditionally flavored, however, it is occasionally flavored like alcoholic drinks.

Alcoholic
A "spirit and mixer" is any combination of one alcoholic spirit with one non-alcoholic component, such as gin and tonic, whereas a cocktail generally comprises three or more liquid ingredients, at least one of which is alcoholic.

 List of cocktails
 List of beer cocktails
 List of flaming beverages
 List of national drinks
 List of wine cocktails

Supplies
 List of glassware
 List of common edible cocktail garnishes
 List of common inedible cocktail garnishes

See also

 List of beverages

References

 Mixed Drink
Food- and drink-related lists